The Newfoundland and Labrador Soccer Association is the governing body for soccer in the Canadian province of Newfoundland and Labrador. It is a member association of the Canadian Soccer Association.

External links
 Newfoundland and Labrador Soccer Association - Official website

 
Soccer governing bodies in Canada
Soccer in Newfoundland and Labrador
Soccer